Vukovar Synagogue was the main synagogue of the Jewish community in Vukovar, Croatia, after the first smaller synagogue was sold to the Calvinist church in 1910. It was constructed in 1889 in the Kingdom of Croatia-Slavonia, within the Austria-Hungary.

The Jews of Vukovar settled in the city in the 19th century from other parts of the Habsburg monarchy. The Jewish community in Vukovar was one of the oldest and most significant Jewish communities in Croatia. The first Vukovar synagogue was built in 1845 by architect Fran Funtak. In 1889, Austria-Hungarian architect Ludwig Schöne (de) built the Great Vukovar Synagogue for over 200 members of the Vukovar Jewish community. In 1941, during World War II, the synagogue was plundered and devastated by the Nazis. Almost all members of the city's Jewish community were killed during the Holocaust; including Rabbi Izrael Scher (also known as Izidor Šer, born 1901) and his wife, Klara (born 1906), both Doctors, who were murdered at the Jasenovac concentration camp in July 1941. In 1958, communist authorities of the SFR Yugoslavia demolished the synagogue and sold the remaining ruins.

A virtual reconstruction of the Vukovar Synagogue has been done by the Vienna University of Technology.

See also
 Jewish Cemetery of Vukovar

References

Bibliography

 

1889 establishments in Croatia
1941 disestablishments in Croatia
Ashkenazi Jewish culture in Croatia
Ashkenazi synagogues
Buildings and structures demolished in 1958
Synagogue
Destroyed synagogues in Croatia
History of Vukovar
Kingdom of Croatia-Slavonia
Moorish Revival synagogues
Mudéjar architecture
Religious buildings and structures in Vukovar-Syrmia County
Religious organizations disestablished in the 1940s
Religious organizations established in 1889
Synagogue buildings with domes
Synagogues completed in 1889
Synagogues destroyed by Nazi Germany